Lt. General Ali Ghaidan Majid (born 1950/1951) was the commander of the Iraqi Army between 2006 and September 2014. He is from the Balad Ruz area of Diyala province, Iraq.  He served in the Iraqi Army during the regime of Saddam Hussein, but like a number of other generals, was imprisoned by Saddam following the Gulf War.

Sources/external links

http://www.nytimes.com/2007/05/15/world/middleeast/15embed.html
http://www.nytimes.com/2009/02/14/world/middleeast/14iraq.html

See also
Iraqi security forces
Iraq War
War on Terrorism

Iraqi generals
Year of birth uncertain
Living people
Year of birth missing (living people)